João Carlos Rocha Vicente (born 3 July 1984 in Lisbon, Portugal) is a Cape Verdean professional footballer who plays as a left back.

External links

1984 births
Living people
Footballers from Lisbon
Portuguese footballers
Portuguese people of Cape Verdean descent
Citizens of Cape Verde through descent
Cape Verdean footballers
Association football defenders
Liga Portugal 2 players
Segunda Divisão players
G.D. Tourizense players
Louletano D.C. players
Imortal D.C. players
Sertanense F.C. players
Moreirense F.C. players
F.C. Arouca players
C.D. Tondela players
G.D. Chaves players
U.D. Leiria players
Clube Oriental de Lisboa players
Cape Verde international footballers